Leninsk-Kuznetsky, known as Kolchugino until 1925, is a city in Kemerovo Oblast, Russia, located on both banks of the Inya River (Ob's tributary). Population:    128,000 (1972); 83,000 (1939); 20,000 (1926).

Administrative and municipal status
Within the framework of administrative divisions, Leninsk-Kuznetsky serves as the administrative center of Leninsk-Kuznetsky District, even though it is not a part of it. As an administrative division, it is, together with two rural localities, incorporated separately as Leninsk-Kuznetsky City Under Oblast Jurisdiction—an administrative unit with the status equal to that of the districts. As a municipal division, Leninsk-Kuznetsky City Under Oblast Jurisdiction is incorporated as Leninsk-Kuznetsky Urban Okrug.

Economy
Leninsk-Kuznetsky is one of the main coal mining centers of the Kuznetsk Basin. It is entirely turned towards the extraction of coal. Many mines are within the limits of the city.

Transportation
The city is on the trunk roads Leninsk-Kuznetsky–Novosibirsk and Kemerovo–Novokuznetsk and on the railway lines Novosibirsk–Novokuznetsk and Kemerovo–Novokuznetsk.

The city has had a trolleybus network since 1984.

Sports
The final Olympic gymnastic teams trained here for the 2008 Summer Olympics in Beijing.

Notable people
 Oleg Tinkov, Russian businessman in banking, real estate and yachting
 Maksim Devyatovskiy, Russian Olympic gymnast
 Maria Filatova, Soviet Olympic gymnast
 Anastasia Ilyankova, ROC Olympic gymnast
 Daria Joura, Australian Olympic gymnast
 Gennady Konyakhin, politician

References

Notes

Sources

Cities and towns in Kemerovo Oblast